Shin Dong-Chul  (born November 9, 1961) is a South Korean footballer.

He graduated in Myongji University, He was the K-League Top Assistor of 1992 season.

Honours

Player
 Yukong Elephants
 K-League Winners (1) : 1989

Individual
 K-League Top Assistor : 1992
 K-League Best XI : 1988, 1992

External links
 

K League 1 players
Jeju United FC players
South Korean footballers
1961 births
Living people
Association football forwards